"What U Gon' Do" is a single by Lil Jon & the Eastside Boyz from their album Crunk Juice and features Lil Scrappy. It is one of the best known songs that Lil Jon & The Eastside Boyz recorded together.

The track reached number 22 on the Billboard Hot 100, number 8 on the Hot Rap Tracks chart, and number 13 on the Hot R&B/Hip-Hop Singles & Tracks chart.

Two remixes to the song was an addition to the Crunk Juice in the Remix CD. A Jamaican remix featuring Elephant Man and Lady Saw and a Latino remix featuring Pitbull and Daddy Yankee.  The Latino remix became the official remix.

The song appeared in a season one episode of The Andy Milonakis Show when Lil Jon guest starred.

Charts

Weekly charts

Year-end charts

Release history

References

2004 singles
2004 songs
Lil Jon songs
Lil Scrappy songs
Daddy Yankee songs
Pitbull (rapper) songs
Songs written by Lil Jon
Dirty rap songs
Hardcore hip hop songs
Crunk songs